The Nigeria Rugby Football Federation (NRFF) is the governing body for rugby union in Nigeria. It is affiliated to the Nigeria Olympic Committee, Rugby Africa and  World Rugby.

The NRFF is constituted with a democratic board headed by President; Dr Ademola Are and Vice President; AIG Aliyu Abubakar (Rtd) who have been elected to run the affairs of rugby in Nigeria.

References

Rugby union governing bodies in Africa
Rugby union in Nigeria
Rugby
Sports organizations established in 1998
Sports organizations based in Lagos